Eudonia epimystis is a moth of the family Crambidae. It is endemic to the island of Hawaii.

External links

Eudonia
Endemic moths of Hawaii
Moths described in 1899